There are also two  Byron Townships in Minnesota.

It is surrounded by Kalmar Township. The population was 6,312 at the 2020 census.

Local industries are in the form of farm services and printing.  A grain elevator is situated next to the rail line that runs through town, which is owned by the Dakota, Minnesota and Eastern Railroad.  Schmidt Printing (a subsidiary of Taylor Corporation) is another major company in town. Byron is also a bedroom community for nearby Rochester, Minnesota.

History
Byron was platted in 1864. The city was named after Port Byron, New York by George W. Van Dusen, an early businessman in the area. A post office called Byron has been in operation since 1868. Byron was incorporated in 1873. Before the town was established, a small community known as Bear Grove was west of present-day Byron.

Geography

Demographics

2010 census
As of the census of 2010, there were 4,914 people, 1,796 households, and 1,366 families residing in the city. The racial makeup of the city was 96.2% White, 0.7% African American, 0.1% Native American, 1.0% Asian, 0.1% Pacific Islander, 0.5% from other races, and 1.4% from two or more races. Hispanic or Latino of any race were 1.8% of the population.

There were 1,796 households, of which 44.7% had children under the age of 18 living with them, 60.7% were married couples living together, 11.6% had a female householder with no husband present, 3.8% had a male householder with no wife present, and 23.9% were non-families. 18.9% of all households were made up of individuals, and 4.6% had someone living alone who was 65 years of age or older. The average household size was 2.73 and the average family size was 3.15.

The median age in the city was 33.1 years. 31.1% of residents were under the age of 18; 7.4% were between the ages of 18 and 24; 29.8% were from 25 to 44; 24.3% were from 45 to 64; and 7.3% were 65 years of age or older. The gender makeup of the city was 49.4% male and 50.6% female.

Transportation
Byron has in town and local community to community transportation provided by Rolling Hills Transit. The transportation is fare based and rides can be schedule by call their office or visiting their website at rhtbus.com.

A commuter bus service to Rochester is operated by Rochester City Lines and has three trips daily through Byron each day. Two of those three go directly to a park-and-ride lot on the eastern edge of town, while the third zigzags through the city to pick up riders.

The DM&E rail line was originally built by the Winona and St. Peter Railroad, which reached west through town to neighboring Kasson in 1865. The station was west of what is now Byron Avenue, and was rebuilt in 1883. The Chicago and North Western Railway gained control of the Winona and St. Peter a few years after the line reached Byron. The C&NW operated the line until the 1980s, when it was spun off to create the DM&E.

Community and government
Byron has a mayor and a four-member city council. There are also four other government boards including an economic development authority and a park board. Byron City Hall is near the elementary school on 10th Avenue. It is also a fairly new structure. The old city hall is in the center of town at Byron Avenue and 4th Street and was built in 1938. The city's first water tower was built next to that location in 1935, and torn down around 2004. The Byron city flag consists of three stripes of blue, white, and green. It has five stars on the top blue stripe, and a bear in the center of the white stripe. The flag's design was chosen in a citywide contest and the winning design was designed by Jeff and Allison Ihrke.

The weekly Byron Review newspaper covers city events. It is owned by Community News Corporation, which also operates papers in Hayfield and Dodge Center.

Parks and recreation

Parks
One of the major parks in the county, Oxbow Park and Zollman Zoo, is 3.5 miles north of town. The zoo has dozens of animals from 30 different native species, including a number of birds, a mountain lion, wolves, otters, white-tailed deer, and some bison.

Byron has several city parks, a public pool open in the summer, and many recreational fields, such as soccer and baseball fields.

Golf
Byron is home to Somerby Golf Club and Community, a private golf club and community on the north side of the city. Links of Byron was a nine-hole public course that closed in 2015.

References

External links
City of Byron
Byron Chamber of Commerce
Byron Public Schools

Cities in Minnesota
Cities in Olmsted County, Minnesota
Rochester metropolitan area, Minnesota
1873 establishments in Minnesota